The International Organization for the Study of the Old Testament (IOSOT) is a scientific organization of Old Testament scholars, established in 1950 in Leiden. The first congress was held in 1953 in Copenhagen.

List of Congresses and Presidents

Bibliography 
 Rudolf Smend Jr. and David E. Orton (Translator): "Fifty Years International Organization for the Study of the Old Testament and Vetus Testamentum" In: Vetus Testamentum 50 (2000), pp. 14–26.

References 

Biblical studies organizations
International scientific organizations
Scientific organizations established in 1950